The Chameleon is a deception party game designed by Rikki Tahta and published in 2017 by Big Potato Games. All players except one—the "Chameleon"—are given a secret topic and attempt to identify the Chameleon, while the Chameleon attempts to identify the topic, using social deduction.

Gameplay 
At the start of each round, a Topic Card containing different topics is placed in the middle for all players to see. Each player is given a Code Card which contain coordinate values. A yellow six-sided dice and a blue eight-sided dice are rolled. The values correspond to a coordinate on the Code Cards, which can then be used to locate a secret topic on the Topic Card. One player secretly receives a Chameleon card instead of a Code Card, and does not know the secret topic.

Every player takes a turn saying a word related to the Topic Card, including the Chameleon. Players debate and vote on the Chameleon's identity based on the words given and the player with the most votes flips over their card. If the card flipped is a Code Card, the Chameleon wins the round. If it is a Chameleon Card, the Chameleon gets a chance to guess the secret topic. They win if their guess is correct, otherwise all other players are the winners.

There is an optional scoring system in which the Chameleon scores two points for if a Code Card is flipped and one point if their card is flipped but they can guess the secret topic, and everyone else scores two points only if the Chameleon Card is flipped and the Chameleon guess incorrectly. The first player to five points wins.

Reception 
Wirecutter described The Chameleon as a "a great introduction to social deduction games" due to its simple rules and strategic possibilities. Wired praised its quick and easy gameplay, but warned that "some topics can be tricky for younger kids".

Awards 
The Chameleon was the winner of the 2017 UK Games Expo Best Part Game award. It won silver for Imagination Gaming's 2017 Best Family Game Award and was also nominated for their 2017 Best Literacy Game Award. The game was a nominee for Best Party Game in BoardGameGeek's 2017 Golden Geek Awards.

References 

Party games
Social deduction games
Board games introduced in 2017